The United States Ambassador to Singapore is the official representative of the United States of America to the Republic of Singapore. The incumbent ambassador is Jonathan E. Kaplan since December  6, 2021, serving as the ambassador of the Embassy of the United States in Singapore.

List of ambassadors

See also
Singapore–United States relations
Foreign relations of Singapore
Ambassadors of the United States

References

United States Department of State: Background notes on Singapore

External links
 United States Department of State: Chiefs of Mission for Singapore
 United States Department of State: Singapore
 United States Embassy in Singapore

Main
Singapore
United States